Within the petroleum industry, proved crude oil reserves and lease condensate in the United States was  of crude oil as of the end of 2021, excluding the Strategic Petroleum Reserve. 

In 2012, the Energy Information Administration using data compiled by the United States Geolgical Survey under the Department of the Interior estimated US undiscovered, technically recoverable oil resources to be an additional 198 billion barrels.

History 
Over 1 million exploratory and developmental crude oil wells have been drilled in the US since 1949 to estimate the undiscovered, technically recoverable oil in the United States.

The last comprehensive National Assessment was completed in 1995. Since 2000 the USGS has been re-assessing basins of the U.S. that are considered to be priorities for oil and gas resources; re-assessing 22, and has plans to re-assess 10 more basins. These 32 basins represent about 97% of the discovered and undiscovered oil and gas resources of the United States. The three areas considered to hold the most oil are the coastal plain (1002) area of ANWR, the National Petroleum Reserve of Alaska, and the Bakken Formation.

Proved reserves major discoveries

In 1970, supergiant Prudhoe Bay field was found in Alaska.

Reserves to Production ratio

The reserves-to-production ratio (R/P) was 11.08 years in 1970. It hit a trough of 8.49 years in 1986 as oil pumped through the Alaska pipeline began to peak. R/P was 11.26 years in 2007.

Production impacts 

When global oil prices (~US$147.50) peaked in summer 2008 many petroleum oil extraction projects were brought online, allowing annual production to steadily increase, with one year of decline in 2020 attributed to the COVID pandemic.

In 2012 the oil production of the USA increased by 800,000 barrels per day, the highest ever recorded increase in one year since oil drilling began in 1859. In April 2013, US crude production was at a more than 20-year high, aided by the shale gas and tight oil boom; with production near 7.2 million barrels per day. With increased production, experts think that the USA could pass Saudi Arabia as the largest oil producer.

Consumption and net imports
Consuming less or importing more oil prolongs the useful life of existing oil reserves. 

In 2007 the largest net suppliers(importers) of petroleum products were Canada and Mexico, which supplied 

In 2011, the US consumed 18.8 million barrels of petroleum products per day, and imported a net 8.4 million barrels per day; the EIA reported the United States "Dependence on Net Petroleum Imports" in 2011 as 45% accouting for nearly 50% of the US trade deficit in 2011. 

For a brief period during 2008-2009 the USA became a net exporter of refined oil products.

Strategic Petroleum Reserve

This is roughly 32% of US oil imports, or 75% of imports from OPEC.

Conventional Prospective resources

Onshore 
The United States Geological Survey (USGS) under the Department of the Interiorestimates undiscovered technically recoverable crude oil onshore in United States to be

Arctic 
This estimate is a best case scenario of technically recoverable oil during the area's primary production years if legislation were passed in 2008 to allow drilling.

The quantity of undiscovered oil beneath Federal lands (excluding State and Native areas) is estimated to range between 5.9 and 13.2 BBO, with a mean value of 9.3 BBO. Most oil accumulations are expected to be of moderate size, on the order of 30 to  each. Large accumulations like the Prudhoe Bay oil field (whose  ultimate recovery is approximately ), are not expected to occur. The volumes of undiscovered, technically recoverable oil estimated for NPRA are similar to the volumes estimated for ANWR. However, because of differences in accumulation sizes (the ANWR study area is estimated to contain more accumulations in larger size classes) and differences in assessment area (the NPRA study area is more than 12 times larger than the ANWR study area), economically recoverable resources are different at low oil prices. But at market prices above $40 per barrel, estimates of economically recoverable oil for NPRA are similar to ANWR.

Tight oil 
In April 2008, the USGS released a report giving a new resource assessment of the Bakken Formation underlying portions of Montana and North Dakota. If accurate, this reassessment would make it the largest "continuous" oil accumulation (The USGS uses "continuous" to describe accumulations requiring extensive artificial fracturing to allow the oil to flow to the borehole) ever discovered in the U.S. The formation is estimated to contain significantly more—figures in excess of  have been reported—but it is yet uncertain how much of this oil is recoverable using current technology. In 2011, Harold Hamm claimed that the recoverable share may reach ; this would mean that Bakken contains more extractable petroleum than all other known oil fields in the country, combined.

Offshore
At $80/bbl crude prices, the MMS estimates that  are economically recoverable. The moratoria and presidential withdrawal cover about 85 percent of OCS area offshore the lower 48 states. The MMS estimates that the resources in OCS areas currently off limits to leasing and development total (mean estimate).

Unconventional prospective resources

Oil Shale prospective resources

Oil shale

The United States has the largest known deposits of oil shale in the world, according to the Bureau of Land Management and holds an estimated  of potentially recoverable oil. Oil shale does not actually contain oil, but a waxy oil precursor known as kerogen. There is significant commercial production of oil from oil shale in the United States in North Dakota and Montana. 

Oil-bearing shales in North Dakota and Montana are producing increasing amounts of oil. As of April 2013, US crude production was at a more than 20-year high, since the shale gas and tight oil boom; production was near 7.2 million barrels per day.

Oil sands

There are significant volumes of heavy oil in the oil sands of northeast Utah. There has yet to be any significant production  from these deposits.

See also

 Oil reserves
 Strategic Petroleum Reserve (United States)
 United States Oil Fund (USO)

References

Fossil fuels in the United States
Geology of the United States
United States